Hai (Helen) Li is a Chinese-American electrical and computer engineer known for her research on neuromorphic engineering, the development of computation systems based on physical artificial neurons, and on deep learning, techniques for using deep neural networks in machine learning. She is Clare Boothe Luce Professor of Electrical and Computer Engineering at Duke University.

Education and career
Li earned both a bachelor's degree and a master's degree from Tsinghua University, in 1998 and 2000 respectively. She completed her Ph.D. at Purdue University in 2004.

She worked in industry at Qualcomm, Intel, and Seagate Technology on computer memory technology including static random-access memory, memristors, and spintronicss, before returning to academia in 2009 with a position at the New York University Tandon School of Engineering, then known as the Polytechnic Institute of New York University. She moved from there to the University of Pittsburgh in 2012, and then to Duke University in 2017, becoming Clare Boothe Luce Associate Professor before her promotion to full professor.

Recognition
Li was named an IEEE Fellow in 2018, "for contributions to neuromorphic computing systems". She was elected as a 2021 ACM Fellow "for contributions to neuromorphic computing and deep-learning acceleration".

References

External links

Year of birth missing (living people)
Living people
American electronics engineers
American women engineers
Chinese electronics engineers
Chinese women engineers
Tsinghua University alumni
Purdue University alumni
Duke University faculty
Fellow Members of the IEEE
Fellows of the Association for Computing Machinery